Feng Zhi (17 September 1905 – 22 February 1993) was a Chinese writer and translator. He was also the director and then honorary director of the Institute of Foreign Literature, Chinese Academy of Social Sciences since 1964.

Feng published several collections of poems, including Songs of Yesterday and Northern Journey and Other Poems, in his early life. Then he went to Germany and introduced the poetry of Rilke, Goethe, Heine, along with Novalis afterwards, thus he was bestowed Goethe Medal in the 1980s. He was also a scholar of Du Fu.

References 

1905 births
1993 deaths
20th-century Chinese male writers
20th-century Chinese translators
20th-century Chinese poets
People's Republic of China translators
Writers from Baoding
Poets from Hebei
Peking University alumni
Heidelberg University alumni
National University of Peking alumni
Academic staff of the National Southwestern Associated University
Educators from Hebei
Republic of China poets
People's Republic of China poets